Çadırlı is a village in Silifke district of Mersin Province, Turkey. It is situated in Taurus Mountains. The population of Çadırlı is 271 as of 2011.

References

Villages in Silifke District